Louis-Armand-Constantin de Rohan, Chevalier de Rohan and Prince de Montbazon, (6 April 1732 – 27 July 1794) was a French naval officer of the eighteenth century.

Life 
Louis-Armand-Constantin was the fifth of seven children of Hercule Mériadec, Duc de Montbazon and Louise Gabrielle Julie de Rohan-Soubise, daughter of Hercule Mériadec, Prince de Rohan, head of the cadet branch of the House of Rohan. Louis-Armand-Constantin was a member of the senior branch of the House of Rohan, a powerful French family which claimed descent from the sovereign Dukes of Brittany, in right of which it held the rank of prince étranger at the French court.

Rohan joined the French Navy and was the captain of Raisonnable  at the action of 29 April 1758, at which his ship was captured in the Bay of Biscay by HMS Dorsetshire  during the Seven Years' War. In 1764, after the war, he was promoted to Chef d'escadre and in 1766 was appointed governor of Leeward Islands. In 1768 he was engaged in quelling a revolt by the French colonists in Saint-Domingue. In 1770 de Rohan was promoted to Navy Lieutenant General and the following year married Louise Rosalie Le Tonnelier de Breteuil, daughter of François Victor Le Tonnelier de Breteuil. He was an active Freemason.

At the outbreak of the American Revolutionary War, Rohan was promoted to vice-admiral in the Levant Fleet, based at Toulon, but his actions at Saint-Domingue in 1768 and 1769 had attracted controversy and he was repeatedly refused colonial and command postings. Following the French Revolution of 1789, towards which he was openly hostile, he left the Navy, and in 1794, after refusing to prove his allegiance to the French Republic he was condemned by a Revolutionary Tribunal and executed in Paris by guillotine on 27 July.

1732 births
1794 deaths
French Navy admirals
French people executed by guillotine during the French Revolution
Louis-Armand Constantin
Governors of Saint-Domingue